Michel Lotito (June 15, 1950 June 25, 2007) was a French entertainer, born in Grenoble, famous for deliberate consumption of indigestible objects. He came to be known as Monsieur "Mouth" Mangetout ("Mr. Eat-All"). He started eating this unusual diet at age 9.

Entertainment 
Michel Lotito began eating unusual material at 9 years of age, and he performed publicly beginning in 1966, around the age of 16. He had an eating disorder known as pica, which is a psychological disorder characterised by an appetite for substances that are largely non-nutritive. Doctors determined that Lotito also had a thick lining in his stomach and intestines which allowed his consumption of sharp metal without suffering injury. Lotito also had digestive juices that were unusually powerful, meaning that he could digest the unusual materials. However, it also meant that soft foods, such as bananas and hard-boiled eggs, made him sick.

Lotito's performances involved the consumption of metal, glass, rubber and other materials. He disassembled, cut up, and consumed items such as bicycles, shopping carts, televisions, and a Cessna 150, among other items. The Cessna 150 took roughly two years to be "eaten", from 1978 to 1980. 

Lotito claimed not to suffer ill effects from his consumption of substances typically considered poisonous. It is estimated that between 1959 and 1997, Lotito "had eaten nearly nine tons of metal."

Lotito's method for eating all of this metal was to break it into small pieces before attempting to eat it. He then drank mineral oil and continued to drink water while swallowing the metal bits. This acted as a lubricant to help the metal slide down his throat. Lotito had no problem "passing" his unusual diet.

Awards
Lotito holds the record for the 'strangest diet' in the Guinness Book of Records. He was awarded a brass plaque by the publishers to commemorate his abilities. He  devoured his award.

Death
Lotito died of natural causes on June 25, 2007, ten days after his 57th birthday. He is buried at Saint Roch Cemetery in Grenoble, his hometown.

List of unusual items consumed
At least: 

45 door hinges
18 bicycles
15 shopping carts
7 TV sets
6 chandeliers
2 beds
1 pair of skis
1 computer
1 Cessna 150 light aircraft
1 waterbed (full of water)
 of steel chain at once
1 coffin (with handles)
1 Guinness award plaque

References

1950 births
2007 deaths
French performance artists
People from Grenoble
Pica (disorder)
Ripley's Believe It or Not!